The following is a list of pipeline accidents in the United States in 1983. It is one of several lists of U.S. pipeline accidents. See also: list of natural gas and oil production accidents in the United States.

Incidents 

This is not a complete list of all pipeline accidents. For natural gas alone, the Pipeline and Hazardous Materials Safety Administration (PHMSA), a United States Department of Transportation agency, has collected data on more than 3,200 accidents deemed serious or significant since 1987.

A "significant incident" results in any of the following consequences:
 Fatality or injury requiring in-patient hospitalization.
 $50,000 or more in total costs, measured in 1984 dollars.
 Liquid releases of five or more barrels (42 US gal/barrel).
 Releases resulting in an unintentional fire or explosion.

PHMSA and the National Transportation Safety Board (NTSB) post-incident data and results of investigations into accidents involving pipelines that carry a variety of products, including natural gas, oil, diesel fuel, gasoline, kerosene, jet fuel, carbon dioxide, and other substances. Occasionally pipelines are re-purposed to carry different products.

The following incidents occurred during 1983:

 In January 1983, a pipeline owned by Diamond Shamrock began to leak into a creek, in Lipscomb County, Texas. Before the leak was detected and the flow of oil shut down, a period of about two weeks, about 100,000 gallons of crude petroleum were discharged into a creek.
 1983 On February 1, a corroded gas service line caused a natural gas explosion and flash fire that destroyed a house, killed two persons, and injured three persons in Pryor, Oklahoma, and damaged an adjacent house.
There were no injuries.
 1983 On March 15, an 8-inch LPG pipeline was hit by a rotating auger used for planting trees near West Odessa, Texas. After several minutes, the escaping LPG at 1,060 psi ignited, killing 5 people and injuring 5 others. Flames went as high as 600 feet into the air.
 1983 On March 27, a pump for a petroleum products pipeline broke, causing up to 420,000 gallons of diesel fuel to spill into the Bowie River in Collins, Mississippi.
 1983 30 to 40 homes were advised to evacuate for several hours in Castle Shannon, Pennsylvania on May 1, after a Mobil pipeline leaked gasoline.
 1983 On May 6, a gas pipeline broke, forcing 100 people to evacuate in Cherry Hill, New Jersey.
 1983 A 36-inch gas transmission pipeline exploded and burned in Caldwell, Ohio on May 21, destroying two homes, burning 100 acres of vegetation, and closing nearby Interstate 77. There were three minor injuries.
 1983 A 16-inch gas pipeline ruptured and burned near Athens, Texas, on July 19. A nearby section of the same pipeline had ruptured the year before.
 East Boston gas surge: On September 23, gas service pressure surged up in a section of Boston, Massachusetts. 3 major structure fires, numerous smaller fires, and an explosion at a restaurant followed. There was no serious injuries. A flooded gas regulator vault was the cause.
 1983 On October 10, a bulldozer ruptured a gas pipeline serving the Lake Park, Iowa area, causing gas supply shortages in the area. There were no injuries.
 1983 On October 11, a 10 inch gasoline pipeline leaked between 20,000 and 42,000 gallons of gasoline, in Stow, Ohio. There were no injuries. 
 1983 18 people inside a supermarket in South Charleston, West Virginia on October 17 were hurt, when gas from a leaking Columbia Gas line exploded. One Columbia Gas worker was also hurt. The lack of communication from the Columbia crew working on the gas line to the store Manager was cited as a contributing factor.
 1983 A Mid-Valley crude oil pipeline exploded and burned, at a pipeline terminal, in Lima, Ohio on December 25. The fire spread to a holding tank, forcing nearby residents to evacuate.

References

Lists of pipeline accidents in the United States